Misodendrum is a genus of hemiparasites which grow as mistletoes on various species of Nothofagus. Its species are all restricted to South America. The name of the genus is incorrectly spelt in a number of ways, including Misodendron and Myzodendron.

Misodendrum is placed in its own family, Misodendraceae, in the order Santalales.

These plants have the common name of feathery mistletoes.

Species
, The Plant List accepts the following species:
Misodendrum angulatum Phil.
Misodendrum brachystachyum DC.
Misodendrum gayanum Tiegh.
Misodendrum linearifolium DC.
Misodendrum macrolepis Phil.
Misodendrum oblongifolium DC.
Misodendrum punctulatum Banks ex DC.
Misodendrum quadriflorum DC.

See also
Parasitic plant

References

External links
 Misodendraceae in L. Watson and M.J. Dallwitz (1992 onwards). The families of flowering plants 
 Misodendraceae at Parasitic plants

Santalales
Flora of South America
Santalales genera
Taxa named by Joseph Banks
Taxa named by Augustin Pyramus de Candolle